La Mujer del Año is a recording of the music for the play Mujer del Año performed by Mexican singer Verónica Castro. It was released in 1995. The play is based on the 1942 film Woman of the Year with Spencer Tracy and Katharine Hepburn and the 1981 musical Woman of the Year.

Track listing

 "OBERTURA"
 "LA MUJER DEL AÑO"  
 "EL JUEGO DEL POKER" 
 "NOS VEREMOS EN LAS TIRAS COMICAS" 
 "ACERTE" 
 "CALLATE GERALD"
 "Y QUE MAS DA"
 "UNO DE USTEDES"
 "CONVERSACIÓN DEBAJO DE LA MESA"
 "NOSOTROS DOS"
 "ESTO NO MARCHA"
 "SE LO ADVERTI"
 "LA MUJER DEL AÑO" (REPRISE)
 "YO ME GRADUE"
 "DESPERTAR CONTENTO"
 "LOS DÍAS VEO PASAR"
 "FANTASTICO"
 "FANTASTICO" (ENCORE)
 "LO VAMOS A LOGAR"

1995 albums
Verónica Castro albums